The 2017–18 Memphis Grizzlies season was the 23rd season of the franchise in the National Basketball Association (NBA). During this season, the Grizzlies announced that both Zach Randolph and Tony Allen would have their numbers be retired for the franchise at some point in the future, both of whom would be the first for this franchise's history. On November 27, 2017, head coach David Fizdale was fired after an eight-game losing streak and a publicized benching of Marc Gasol. Associate head coach J. B. Bickerstaff was promoted as an interim head coach.

The Grizzlies also missed the playoffs for the first time since the 2009–10 NBA season, as well as recording one of their longest losing streaks in franchise history near the end of the season with 19 straight losses from January 31 to March 17, 2018, beginning the losing steak with a 101–105 loss to the Indiana Pacers, but finally snapping their losing streak with a 101–94 victory over the Denver Nuggets on Saint Patrick's Day.

The Grizzlies would then suffer their worst loss in franchise history during the regular season on March 22, 2018, losing to the Charlotte Hornets 79–140 in a 61-point blowout. Star point guard Mike Conley Jr. played only 12 games due to injury.

It was their first 60+ losing record since 2007–08, and also their first season since 2008–09 without Zach Randolph, as he signed with the Sacramento Kings via free agency in July 2017. The signing reunited him with Grizzlies teammate Vince Carter, who also signed with them the same day. Randolph led the Grizzlies to seven playoff appearances and one Conference Finals appearance (2013).

Draft

The Grizzlies originally did not have a pick in the 2017 NBA Draft, but they did acquire the Orlando Magic's 35th pick and Houston Rockets' 45th pick through trades involving future second round draft picks. As a result, they acquired power forward Ivan Rabb out of California and shooting guard Dillon Brooks out of Oregon respectively.

Roster

<noinclude>

Standings

Division

Conference

Game log

Preseason 

|- style="background:#cfc;"
| 1
| October 2
| Orlando
| 
| Jarell Martin (16)
| Brandan Wright (8)
| Chandler Parsons (3)
| FedExForum12,986
| 1–0
|- style="background:#cfc;"
| 2
| October 4
| @ Philadelphia
| 
| Brandan Wright (16)
| Martin, Wright (8)
| Andrew Harrison (5)
| Wells Fargo Center18,102
| 2–0
|- style="background:#fcc;"
| 3
| October 9
| @ Atlanta
| 
| James Ennis (14)
| Marc Gasol (13)
| Marc Gasol (4)
| McCamish Pavilion7,262
| 2–1
|- style="background:#fcc;"
| 4
| October 11
| Houston
| 
| Andrew Harrison (17)
| Tyreke Evans (7)
| Conley jr., Gasol (4)
| FedExForum13,212
| 2–2
|- style="background:#cfc;"
| 5
| October 13
| New Orleans
| 
| Jarell Martin (20)
| Marc Gasol (10)
| Marc Gasol (8)
| FedExForumN/A
| 3–2

Regular season 

|- style="background:#cfc;"
| 1
| October 18
| New Orleans
| 
| Mike Conley Jr. (27)
| Marc Gasol (11)
| Chalmers, Gasol (4)
| FedExForum17,794
| 1–0
|- style="background:#cfc;"
| 2
| October 21
| Golden State
| 
| Marc Gasol (34)
| Marc Gasol (14)
| Mike Conley Jr. (7)
| FedExForum17,794
| 2–0
|- style="background:#cfc;"
| 3
| October 23
| @ Houston
| 
| Marc Gasol (26)
| James Ennis III (11)
| Chalmers, Conley Jr. (4)
| Toyota Center17,129
| 3–0
|-style="background:#fcc;"
| 4
| October 25
| @ Dallas
| 
| Marc Gasol (26)
| Marc Gasol (11)
| Marc Gasol (4)
| American Airlines Center19,674
| 3–1
|-style="background:#cfc;"
| 5
| October 26
| Dallas
| 
| Marc Gasol (25)
| Marc Gasol (13)
| Mario Chalmers (6)
| FedExForum15,839
| 4–1
|- style="background:#cfc;"
| 6
| October 28
| Houston
| 
| Chandler Parsons (24)
| Ennis III, Gasol (7)
| Marc Gasol (7)
| FedExForum17,033
| 5–1
|- style="background:#fcc;"
| 7
| October 30
| Charlotte
| 
| Tyreke Evans (19)
| Tyreke Evans (10)
| Mike Conley Jr. (6)
| FedExForum15,771
| 5–2

|- style="background:#fcc;"
| 8
| November 1
| Orlando
| 
| Marc Gasol (22)
| Marc Gasol (9)
| Chandler Parsons (6)
| FedExForum15,434
| 5–3
|- style="background:#cfc;"
| 9
| November 4
| @ LA Clippers
| 
| Mike Conley Jr. (22)
| Brandan Wright (9)
| Chalmers, Evans (4)
| Staples Center14,777
| 6–3
|- style="background:#fcc;"
| 10
| November 5
| @ LA Lakers
| 
| Tyreke Evans (26)
| Marc Gasol (10)
| Marc Gasol (7)
| Staples Center18,997
| 6–4
|- style="background:#cfc;"
| 11
| November 7
| @ Portland
| 
| Tyreke Evans (21)
| Brooks, Martin (8)
| Mike Conley Jr. (6)
| Moda Center18,692
| 7–4
|- style="background:#fcc;"
| 12
| November 11
| @ Houston
| 
| Tyreke Evans (22)
| Marc Gasol (9)
| Tyreke Evans (6)
| Toyota Center18,055
| 7–5
|- style="background:#fcc;"
| 13
| November 13
| @ Milwaukee
| 
| Tyreke Evans (27)
| Marc Gasol (9)
| Marc Gasol (6)
| BMO Harris Bradley Center13,244
| 7–6
|- style="background:#fcc;"
| 14
| November 15
| Indiana
| 
| Marc Gasol (35)
| Marc Gasol (13)
| Tyreke Evans (9)
| FedExForum16,033
| 7–7
|- style="background:#fcc;"
| 15
| November 18
| Houston
| 
| Chandler Parsons (17)
| Marc Gasol (9)
| Mario Chalmers (8)
| FedExForum17,266
| 7–8
|- style="background:#fcc;"
| 16
| November 20
| Portland
| 
| Mario Chalmers (21)
| Marc Gasol (12)
| Marc Gasol (7)
| FedExForum15,785
| 7–9
|- style="background:#fcc;"
| 17
| November 22
| Dallas
| 
| Tyreke Evans (18)
| Marc Gasol (10)
| Tyreke Evans (7)
| FedExForum16,101
| 7–10
|- style="background:#fcc;"
| 18
| November 24
| @ Denver
| 
| JaMychal Green (21)
| Marc Gasol (6)
| Marc Gasol (14)
| Pepsi Center16,736
| 7–11
|- style="background:#fcc;"
| 19
| November 26
| Brooklyn
| 
| Evans, Gasol (18)
| JaMychal Green (7)
| Evans, McLemore (3)
| FedExForum14,889
| 7–12
|- style="background:#fcc;"
| 20
| November 29
| @ San Antonio
| 
| Tyreke Evans (22)
| JaMychal Green (8)
| Marc Gasol (7)
| AT&T Center18,013
| 7–13

|- style="background:#fcc;"
| 21
| December 1
| San Antonio
| 
| Marc Gasol (16)
| Marc Gasol (13)
| Evans, Gasol, Harrison (4)
| FedExForum16,413
| 7–14
|- style="background:#fcc"
| 22
| December 2
| @ Cleveland
| 
| Tyreke Evans (31)
| Green, Evans (7)
| Tyreke Evans (12)
| Quicken Loans Arena20,562
| 7–15
|- style="background:#cfc;"
| 23
| December 4
| Minnesota
| 
| Marc Gasol (21)
| JaMychal Green (9)
| Tyreke Evans (9)
| FedExForum14,012
| 8–15
|- style="background:#fcc;"
| 24
| December 6
| @ New York
| 
| Marc Gasol (17)
| Marc Gasol (8)
| Andrew Harrison (5)
| Madison Square Garden19,812
| 8–16
|- style="background:#fcc;"
| 25
| December 8
| Toronto
| 
| Tyreke Evans (27)
| Marc Gasol (7)
| Andrew Harrison (7)
| FedEx Forum15,417
| 8–17
|- style="background:#fcc;"
| 26
| December 9
| Oklahoma City
| 
| Tyreke Evans (29)
| Tyreke Evans (13)
| Marc Gasol (6)
| FedEx Forum17,794
| 8–18
|- style="background:#fcc;"
| 27
| December 11
| Miami
| 
| Marc Gasol (19)
| Deyonta Davis (7)
| Chandler Parsons (5)
| FedEx Forum14,857
| 8–19
|- style="background:#fcc;"
| 28
| December 13
| @ Washington
| 
| Andrew Harrison (20)
| JaMychal Green (15)
| Andrew Harrison (7)
| Capital One Arena15,297
| 8–20
|- style="background:#cfc;"
| 29
| December 15
| Atlanta
| 
| Tyreke Evans (22)
| JaMychal Green (12)
| Marc Gasol (5)
| FedExForum15,803
| 9–20
|- style="background:#fcc;"
| 30
| December 16
| Boston
| 
| Marc Gasol (30)
| Marc Gasol (10)
| Evans, Harrison (5)
| FedExForum17,794
| 9–21
|- style="background:#fcc"
| 31
| December 20
| @ Golden State
| 
| Marc Gasol (21)
| Marc Gasol (9)
| Tyreke Evans (6)
| Oracle Arena19,695
| 9–22
|- style="background:#fcc"
| 32
| December 21
| @ Phoenix
| 
| Tyreke Evans (23)
| Marc Gasol (11)
| Evans, Gasol (5)
| Talking Stick Resort Arena16,339
| 9–23
|- style="background:#cfc"
| 33
| December 23
| LA Clippers
| 
| Tyreke Evans (30)
| Marc Gasol (15)
| Tyreke Evans (11)
| FedExForum16,844
| 10–23
|- style="background:#fcc"
| 34
| December 26
| @ Phoenix
| 
| Tyreke Evans (25)
| Gasol, Martin (6)
| Tyreke Evans (5)
| Talking Stick Resort Arena17,105
| 10–24
|- style="background:#cfc"
| 35
| December 27
| @ LA Lakers
| 
| Tyreke Evans (32)
| Marc Gasol (9)
| Tyreke Evans (7)
| Staples Center18,997
| 11–24
|- style="background:#fcc;"
| 36
| December 30
| @ Golden State
| 
| Marc Gasol (27)
| JaMychal Green (8)
| Tyreke Evans (9)
| Oracle Arena19,596
| 11–25
|- style="background:#cfc;"
| 37
| December 31
| @ Sacramento
| 
| Tyreke Evans (26)
| Deyonta Davis (9)
| Tyreke Evans (5)
| Golden 1 Center17,583
| 12–25

|- style="background:#fcc;"
| 38
| January 2
| @ LA Clippers
| 
| Tyreke Evans (18)
| Jarell Martin (7)
| Tyreke Evans (6)
| Staples Center15,711
| 12–26
|- style="background:#fcc;"
| 39
| January 5
| Washington
| 
| Tyreke Evans (26)
| Marc Gasol (11)
| Tyreke Evans (7)
| FedExForum16,988
| 12–27
|- style="background:#cfc;"
| 40
| January 10
| New Orleans
| 
| Tyreke Evans (28)
| JaMychal Green (14)
| Marc Gasol (7)
| FedExForum14,312
| 13–27
|- style="background:#fcc;"
| 41
| January 12
| @ Denver
| 
| Marc Gasol (22)
| Marc Gasol (11)
| Andrew Harrison (6)
| Pepsi Center15,607
| 13–28
|- style="background:#cfc;"
| 42
| January 15
| LA Lakers
| 
| Dillon Brooks (19)
| Evans, Green (9)
| Tyreke Evans (12)
| FedExForum17,794
| 14–28
|- style="background:#cfc;"
| 43
| January 17
| NY Knicks
| 
| Tyreke Evans (23)
| JaMychal Green (13)
| Tyreke Evans (10)
| FedExForum12,885
| 15–28
|- style="background:#cfc;"
| 44
| January 19
| Sacramento
| 
| Dillon Brooks (22)
| JaMychal Green (10)
| Tyreke Evans (5)
| FedExForum16,831
| 16–28
|- style="background:#fcc;"
| 45
| January 20
| @ New Orleans
| 
| Wayne Selden (27)
| JaMychal Green (16)
| Marc Gasol (7)
| Smoothie King Center18,212
| 16–29
|- style="background:#cfc;"
| 46
| January 22
| Philadelphia
| 
| Marc Gasol (19)
| Jarell Martin (8)
| Tyreke Evans (8)
| FedExForum14,288
| 17–29
|- style="background:#fcc;"
| 47
| January 24
| San Antonio
| 
| Marc Gasol (18)
| Brooks, Gasol (7)
| Andrew Harrison (6)
| FedExForum15,812
| 17–30
|- style="background:#fcc;"
| 48
| January 26
| LA Clippers
| 
| Chalmers, Martin (17)
| Marc Gasol (12)
| Chalmers, Gasol (10)
| FedExForum16,369
| 17–31
|- style="background:#cfc;"
| 49
| January 29
| Phoenix
| 
| Tyreke Evans (27)
| Marc Gasol (10)
| Brooks, Harrison (6)
| FedExForum13,202
| 18–31
|- style="background:#fcc;"
| 50
| January 31
| @ Indiana
| 
| Wayne Selden (24)
| Marc Gasol (9)
| Gasol, Harrison (6)
| Bankers Life Fieldhouse15,093
| 18–32

|- style="background:#fcc;"
| 51
| February 1
| @ Detroit
| 
| Marc Gasol (19)
| Marc Gasol (14)
| Andrew Harrison (8)
| Little Caesars Arena17,481
| 18–33
|- style="background:#fcc;"
| 52
| February 4
| @ Toronto
| 
| Marc Gasol (20)
| Wayne Selden (7)
| Marc Gasol (5)
| Air Canada Centre19,800
| 18–34
|- style="background:#fcc;"
| 53
| February 6
| @ Atlanta
| 
| Mario Chalmers (13)
| Ivan Rabb (11)
| Brooks, Harrison (8)
| Philips Arena11,866
| 18–35
|- style="background:#fcc;"
| 54
| February 7
| Utah
| 
| Andrew Harrison (23)
| JaMychal Green (7)
| Marc Gasol (5)
| FedExForum13,187
| 18–36
|- style="background:#fcc;"
| 55
| February 11
| @ Oklahoma City
| 
| Marc Gasol (18)
| JaMychal Green (12)
| Mario Chalmers (6)
| Chesapeake Energy Arena18,203
| 18–37
|- style="background:#fcc;"
| 56
| February 14
| Oklahoma City
| 
| Andrew Harrison (28)
| Tyreke Evans (9)
| Marc Gasol (9)
| FedExForum16,012
| 18–38
|- style="background:#fcc;"
| 57
| February 23
| Cleveland
| 
| Evans, Green (15)
| JaMychal Green (10)
| Tyreke Evans (10)
| FedExForum18,119
| 18–39
|- style="background:#fcc;"
| 58
| February 24
| @ Miami
| 
| Andrew Harrison (17)
| JaMychal Green (11)
| Andrew Harrison (6)
| American Airlines Arena19,600
| 18–40
|- style="background:#fcc;"
| 59
| February 26
| @ Boston
| 
| JaMychal Green (21)
| JaMychal Green (11)
| Marc Gasol (8)
| TD Garden18,624
| 18–41
|- style="background:#fcc;"
| 60
| February 28
| Phoenix
| 
| Marc Gasol (22)
| Marc Gasol (13)
| Andrew Harrison (7)
| FedExForum13,484
| 18–42

|- style="background:#fcc;"
| 61
| March 2
| Denver
| 
| Marc Gasol (22)
| Marc Gasol (9)
| Mario Chalmers (6)
| FedExForum16,421
| 18–43
|- style="background:#fcc;"
| 62
| March 3
| @ Orlando
| 
| Ben McLemore (20)
| JaMychal Green (13)
| JaMychal Green (7)
| Amway Center17,875
| 18–44
|- style="background:#fcc;"
| 63
| March 5
| @ San Antonio
| 
| Marc Gasol (23)
| JaMychal Green (15)
| Green, Rathan-Mayes (5)
| AT&T Center18,418
| 18–45
|- style="background:#fcc;"
| 64
| March 7
| @ Chicago
| 
| Dillon Brooks (29)
| JaMychal Green (8)
| Gasol, Rathan-Mayes (5)
| United Center20,210
| 18–46
|- style="background:#fcc;"
| 65
| March 9
| Utah
| 
| Dillon Brooks (18)
| Marc Gasol (11)
| Marc Gasol (6)
| FedExForum15,622
| 18–47
|- style="background:#fcc;"
| 66
| March 10
| @ Dallas
| 
| Dillon Brooks (17)
| JaMychal Green (10)
| Parsons, Simmons (4)
| American Airlines Center19,579
| 18–48
|- style="background:#fcc;"
| 67
| March 12
| Milwaukee
| 
| Marc Gasol (17)
| Green, Gasol (7)
| Martin, Simmons, Rathan-Mayes (5)
| FedExForum14,112
| 18–49
|- style="background:#fcc;"
| 68
| March 15
| Chicago
| 
| Tyreke Evans (25)
| Green, Gasol (10)
| Tyreke Evans (9)
| FedExForum16,511
| 18–50
|- style="background:#cfc;"
| 69
| March 17
| Denver
| 
| Dillon Brooks (24)
| JaMychal Green (13)
| Tyreke Evans (7)
| FedExForum16,501
| 19–50
|- style="background:#fcc;"
| 70
| March 19
| @ Brooklyn
| 
| Andrew Harrison (19)
| JaMychal Green (16)
| Andrew Harrison (8)
| Barclays Center12,856
| 19–51
|- style="background:#fcc;"
| 71
| March 21
| @ Philadelphia
| 
| Wayne Selden Jr. (18)
| Deyonta Davis (11)
| Mario Chalmers (5)
| Wells Fargo Center10,411
| 19–52
|- style="background:#fcc;"
| 72
| March 22
| @ Charlotte
| 
| Wayne Selden (18)
| Jarell Martin (8)
| Evans, Simmons (4)
| Spectrum Center15,033
| 19–53
|- style="background:#fcc;"
| 73
| March 24
| LA Lakers
| 
| Andrew Harrison (20)
| JaMychal Green (16)
| Andrew Harrison (9)
| FedExForum18,119
| 19–54
|- style="background:#cfc;"
| 74
| March 26
| @ Minnesota
| 
| Wayne Selden (23)
| JaMychal Green (11)
| Marc Gasol (6)
| Target Center16,290
| 20–54
|- style="background:#cfc;"
| 75
| March 28
| Portland
| 
| Dillon Brooks (21)
| Jarell Martin (14)
| Marc Gasol (6)
| FedExForum16,050
| 21–54
|- style="background:#fcc;"
| 76
| March 30
| @ Utah
| 
| Marc Gasol (28)
| JaMychal Green (6)
| Teague, Simmons (5)
| Vivint Smart Home Arena18,306
| 21–55

|- style="background:#fcc;"
| 77
| April 1
| @ Portland
| 
| Dillon Brooks (28)
| Ivan Rabb (13)
| Marquis Teague (5)
| Moda Center19,545
| 21–56
|- style="background:#fcc;"
| 78
| April 4
| @ New Orleans
| 
| MarShon Brooks (25)
| Ivan Rabb (7)
| MarShon Brooks (7)
| Smoothie King Center16,521
| 21–57 
|- style="background:#fcc;"
| 79
| April 6
| Sacramento
| 
| MarShon Brooks (23)
| Ivan Rabb (11)
| MarShon Brooks (6)
| FedExForum16,527
| 21–58
|- style="background:#cfc;"
| 80
| April 8
| Detroit
| 
| MarShon Brooks (25)
| Marc Gasol (9)
| Marc Gasol (9)
| FedExForum16,044
| 22–58
|- style="background:#fcc;"
| 81
| April 9
| @ Minnesota
| 
| Ben McLemore (18)
| Ivan Rabb (8)
| MarShon Brooks (5)
| Target Center17,641
| 22–59
|- style="background:#fcc;"
| 82
| April 11
| @ Oklahoma City
| 
| Dillon Brooks (36)
| Ivan Rabb (13)
| Kobi Simmons (5)
| Chesapeake Energy Arena18,203
| 22–60

Player statistics

|-
| align="left"| || align="center"| SF
| style=";"|82 || style=";"|74 || 2,350 || 257 || 135 || 73 || 17 || 898
|-
| align="left"|≠ || align="center"| SG
| 7 || 1 || 193 || 21 || 25 || 11 || 3 || 141
|-
| align="left"| || align="center"| PG
| 66 || 10 || 1,421 || 157 || 197 || style=";"|79 || 14 || 507
|-
| align="left"| || align="center"| PG
| 12 || 12 || 373 || 27 || 49 || 12 || 3 || 205
|-
| align="left"| || align="center"| C
| 62 || 6 || 943 || 250 || 40 || 15 || 39 || 360
|-
| align="left"|† || align="center"| SF
| 45 || 14 || 1,053 || 157 || 49 || 32 || 12 || 310
|-
| align="left"| || align="center"| PG
| 52 || 32 || 1,607 || 265 || 269 || 57 || 17 || 1,010
|-
| align="left"| || align="center"| C
| 73 || 73 || style=";"|2,408 || style=";"|592 || style=";"|305 || 54 || style=";"|101 || style=";"|1,258
|-
| align="left"| || align="center"| PF
| 55 || 54 || 1,542 || 464 || 79 || 32 || 25 || 569
|-
| align="left"| || align="center"| PG
| 56 || 46 || 1,326 || 131 || 177 || 38 || 26 || 533
|-
| align="left"|≠ || align="center"| SF
| 20 || 0 || 378 || 38 || 22 || 31 || 6 || 107
|-
| align="left"|‡ || align="center"| PF
| 4 || 0 || 7 || 3 || 0 || 0 || 1 || 6
|-
| align="left"|‡ || align="center"| PF
| 9 || 0 || 60 || 18 || 1 || 3 || 4 || 27
|-
| align="left"|≠ || align="center"| PF
| 4 || 0 || 75 || 11 || 7 || 2 || 0 || 22
|-
| align="left"| || align="center"| PF
| 73 || 36 || 1,661 || 318 || 73 || 39 || 49 || 565
|-
| align="left"| || align="center"| SG
| 56 || 17 || 1,091 || 139 || 51 || 38 || 15 || 422
|-
| align="left"| || align="center"| SF
| 36 || 8 || 691 || 90 || 69 || 18 || 11 || 284
|-
| align="left"| || align="center"| PF
| 36 || 5 || 516 || 158 || 32 || 12 || 13 || 201
|-
| align="left"| || align="center"| SG
| 5 || 0 || 118 || 5 || 18 || 6 || 3 || 29
|-
| align="left"| || align="center"| SG
| 35 || 9 || 692 || 56 || 66 || 18 || 5 || 325
|-
| align="left"| || align="center"| PG
| 32 || 12 || 643 || 50 || 68 || 18 || 5 || 196
|-
| align="left"|‡ || align="center"| PG
| 3 || 0 || 74 || 6 || 13 || 4 || 0 || 11
|-
| align="left"|≠ || align="center"| PG
| 5 || 0 || 119 || 17 || 9 || 8 || 2 || 24
|-
| align="left"|‡ || align="center"| PF
| 27 || 1 || 366 || 93 || 13 || 13 || 25 || 135
|}
After all games.
‡Waived during the season
†Traded during the season
≠Acquired during the season

Transactions

Trades

Free agency

Re-signed

Additions

Subtractions

References

Memphis Grizzlies seasons
Memphis Grizzlies
Memphis Grizzlies
Memphis Grizzlies
Events in Memphis, Tennessee